Eralivayal is a village in the Pattukkottai taluk of Thanjavur district, Tamil Nadu, India.

Demographics 

As per the 2001 census, Eralivayal had a total population of 359 with 187 males and 172 females. The sex ratio was 920. The literacy rate was 72.52.

References 

 

Villages in Thanjavur district